Vegetable ivory or tagua nut is a product made from the very hard white endosperm of the seeds of certain palm trees. Vegetable ivory is named for its resemblance to animal ivory.  Species in the genus Phytelephas (literally "elephant plant"), native to South America, are the most important sources of vegetable ivory. The seeds of the Caroline ivory-nut palm from the Caroline Islands, natangura palm from Solomon Islands and Vanuatu, and the real fan palm, from Sub-Saharan Africa, are also used to produce vegetable ivory. A tagua palm can take up to 15 years to mature. But once it gets to this stage it can go on producing vegetable ivory for up to 100 years. In any given year a tagua palm can produce up to 20 pounds of vegetable ivory.

The material is called corozo or corosso when used in buttons.

Species
Some species from which vegetable ivory is harvested are:

Phytelephas macrocarpa (mainly in Peru and Bolivia)
Phytelephas aequatorialis (mainly in Ecuador)
Phytelephas seemannii (mainly in Colombia)
Phytelephas tenuicaulis

Uses
An early use of vegetable ivory, attested from the 1880s, was the manufacture of buttons.  Rochester, New York was a center of manufacturing where the buttons were "subjected to a treatment which is secret among the Rochester manufacturers", presumably improving their "beauty and wearing qualities". Before plastic became common in button production, about 20% of all buttons produced in the US were made of vegetable ivory.

Vegetable ivory has been used extensively to make dice, knife handles, and chess pieces.  It is a very hard and dense material.  Similar to stone, it is too hard to carve with a knife but instead requires hacksaws and files.

Vegetable ivory is naturally white with a fine marbled grain structure. It can be dyed; dyeing often brings out the grain. It is still commonly used in buttons, jewelry, and artistic carving. Many vegetable ivory buttons were decorated in a way that used the natural tagua nut colour as a contrast to the dyed surface, because the dye did not penetrate deeper than the very first layer. This also helps identify the material.

References

Sculpture materials
Ivory
Handicrafts